The Gilbert Mansion is a historic mansion in Nashville, Tennessee, U.S.. It was built for a Hungarian immigrant who founded Belcourt Theatre. It is listed on the National Register of Historic Places.

History
The mansion was built in 1908 for Joseph Lightman. Lightman was a Jewish Hungarian immigrant who settled in Nashville in the 1880s and worked as a fruit merchant and construction contractor. He was the president of the Nashville Young Men's Hebrew Association in 1920–1921, and a member of the Cumberland Masonic lodge. In 1925, with his son Morris, Lightman opened Hillsboro Theater (later the Belcourt Theatre) in Hillsboro Village. His son founded Malco Theatres.

The house was purchased by Harris Gilbert, a clothing merchant, in 1911. After his death in 1935, it was subsequently inherited by his son, Leon Gilbert, a lawyer.

Architectural significance
The house was designed in the American Foursquare architectural style. It has been listed on the National Register of Historic Places since March 28, 1979.

References

Houses completed in 1908
Houses in Nashville, Tennessee
American Foursquare architecture in Tennessee
Houses on the National Register of Historic Places in Tennessee
1908 establishments in Tennessee